The Solectria Force is a Geo Metro, professionally converted from a new, motorless chassis (known in the industry as a glider) by Solectria Corporation of Wilmington, Massachusetts, starting in 1991, becoming a battery electric vehicle. Solectria subsequently was acquired by Azure Dynamics Corporation in 2004, it is no longer in production. Approximately 400 vehicles were converted in total.

History
The Force was introduced in March 1991, and the first nine were delivered by October to Arizona Public Service, Sacramento Municipal Utility District, and Southern California Edison.

The North Jersey District Water Supply Commission procured a 1996 Solectria Force that is still in service today. The original thirteen 12 volt lead–acid gel cell batteries lasted until April 2011, when they were replaced with nearly 10,000 miles.

In 1997, the base price of the car was $33,995 with lead acid batteries which gave it a range of 50 miles at 45 miles per hour and a top speed of 70 miles per hour. Solectria also offered the Force with a nickel-metal hydride battery pack with an MSRP $88,895. This battery pack gave the Force a range of 100 miles at 45 miles per hour, and the same top speed as the lead acid model at 70 miles per hour.

The city of Morristown, NJ used Solectria "Force" models as "station cars" in a three-year pilot program ending in 2001.

Technical
For the display card on the example shown below:
Base vehicle: 1996 Geo Metro
Top speed 
Range -
Three phase AC motor
Single speed gearbox
156 volt battery pack (thirteen 12 volt lead–acid gel cells)
Zero emissions at the tailpipe

In 1994, the Force was available as a four-seat or two-seat model, with the two-seat model gaining additional range. The standard storage battery used lead-acid chemistry, and a nickel-cadmium battery was optional. By 1998, the NiCd battery option had been dropped in favor of the NiMH battery.

See also
 Solectria Sunrise

References

External links 

 Solectria Owner's Website
 Solectria Force at a Glance
 Electric car likely cause of garage fire

Electric cars
Cars of the United States
Production electric cars
Electric car models